The 1896 North Carolina Tar Heels football team represented the University of North Carolina in the 1896 college football season.  They played eight games with a final record of 3–4–1. The team captain for the 1896 season was Robert Wright.

Schedule

References

North Carolina
North Carolina Tar Heels football seasons
North Carolina Tar Heels football